Rotondo is an Italian surname. Notable people with the surname include:

Anthony Rotondo (born 1957), American mobster
Giovanni Rotondo, composer
Nunzio Rotondo (1924–2009), Italian jazz trumpeter and bandleader
Paolo Rotondo, New Zealand actor

See also
Castle Rotondo, a castle in Croatia

Italian-language surnames